Dr. Abolhassan Naeini (born 1955 in Qazvin) is an Iranian academic and the chancellor of Imam Khomeini International University from 2004 to 2006 and also 2014 to present.

He graduated from New Jersey Institute of Technology and later received his Ph.D. in Civil Engineering from Iran University of Science and Technology.

Naeini was the only chancellor of the university who was elected as by faculty member. Since President Mahmoud Ahmadinejad took office in 2005 this method changed and again all university chancellors were selected by government, so after one year, in 2006 Dr. Hassan Ghafouri Fard a member of Islamic Coalition Party was appointed as his successor by Ministry of Science, Research and Technology.

References

Iranian civil engineers
New Jersey Institute of Technology alumni
Iran University of Science and Technology alumni
Academic staff of Imam Khomeini International University
1955 births
Living people